The 1982 Los Angeles Rams season was the team's 45th year with the National Football League and the 37th season in Los Angeles. The season saw the Rams attempting to improve on their 6–10 record from 1981, a result that saw them miss the playoffs for the first time since 1972. However, a players strike wiped out 7 of the team's 16 games, and shortened the season schedule to only 9 games. The team struggled early, starting 0–2 before the strike commenced. After the conclusion of the strike, the Rams finally got a win at home over the Kansas City Chiefs. However, during this game, quarterback Bert Jones was lost for the season after suffering a neck injury that ultimately led to his retirement. The Rams would lose their next four games before upsetting the 49ers in San Francisco in the season finale. The Rams would ultimately finish the season 2–7, last in their division and dead last in the NFC. It was the teamʼs worst season since 1962, when they won only one game. As a result, head coach Ray Malavasi was fired after the season and replaced by John Robinson for 1983.

Offseason

NFL Draft 

The Rams signed free-agent and oft-injured QB Bert Jones from the Baltimore Colts. Vince Ferragamo returned from the CFL as well, and, with Pat Haden retired, the competition was between these two. Jones opened the season as the starter.

Personnel

Staff

Roster

Regular season

Schedule

Game summaries

Week 4

Standings

See also 
Other Anaheim–based teams in 1982
 California Angels (Anaheim Stadium)
 1982 California Angels season

References

External links 
 1982 Los Angeles Rams at Pro-Football-Reference.com

Los Angeles Rams
Los Angeles Rams seasons
Los Ang